Pistruieni is a commune in Teleneşti District, Moldova. It is composed of three villages: Hîrtop, Pistruieni and Pistruienii Noi.

References

Communes of Telenești District